Insch War Memorial Hospital is a small community hospital located at Insch, Aberdeenshire, Scotland. It is managed by NHS Grampian.

History
The hospital, which was built by public subscription to create a memorial for local people who gave their lives in the First World War, opened in August 1922. It joined the National Health Service in 1948. A day unit was added in 1972 and a further extension was opened in 1993.

The hospital has been closed since March 2020 as management claimed it could not be operated safely due to COVID-19 restrictions.

Services
The hospital's Minor Injury Unit Service is delivered by a dedicated Minor Injury trained nurse and operates Monday to Friday between 8am and 6pm.

References 

Hospital buildings completed in 1922
NHS Grampian
NHS Scotland hospitals
Hospitals in Aberdeenshire
1922 establishments in Scotland